Erin Selby is a politician and former TV personality in Winnipeg, Manitoba, Canada.

Selby earned a bachelor's degree in communications studies from Concordia University.

She previously co-hosted Breakfast Television on Citytv Winnipeg alongside Jon Ljungberg from August 4, 2005, to March 23, 2007. Before signing on with Citytv, she was a weather anchor for Global News Montreal and the consumer watch reporter for CTV Winnipeg. She also appeared in several movies as a reporter, including The Art of War with Wesley Snipes.

Selby was elected as the MLA for the NDP in the riding of Southdale in the 2007 Manitoba provincial election.

It was announced on March 28, 2011, that Selby was appointed Manitoba's new Minister of Advanced Education and Literacy. She replaced Diane McGifford who planned not to run again in the fall.

In October 2013, Selby became Manitoba's Health Minister. Just over a year later, she resigned her cabinet position on November 3, 2014, along with Jennifer Howard, Theresa Oswald, Stan Struthers, and Andrew Swan as part of an ultimately unsuccessful cabinet revolt due to concerns about Premier Selinger's leadership. She remained an NDP MLA after her resignation.

Selby was the NDP candidate in the riding of Saint Boniface—Saint Vital in the 2015 Canadian federal election coming a distant third.

Electoral history

References

External links
 

Women government ministers of Canada
Canadian television hosts
Concordia University alumni
Health ministers of Manitoba
Living people
Members of the Executive Council of Manitoba
New Democratic Party candidates for the Canadian House of Commons
New Democratic Party of Manitoba MLAs
Politicians from Winnipeg
Women MLAs in Manitoba
21st-century Canadian politicians
21st-century Canadian women politicians
Year of birth missing (living people)
Canadian women television hosts